Wold Newton may refer to:

Wold Newton, East Riding of Yorkshire, village in the Yorkshire Wolds, England
Wold Newton, Lincolnshire, village in the Lincolnshire Wolds, England
Wold Newton family, fictional creation of Philip José  Farmer